The Rebellion Act 1572 (14 Eliz. I c.1), full title An Act for the punishment of such as shall rebelliously take or detain or conspire to take or detain from the Queen's Majesty any of her castles, towers, fortresses, holds, &c., was an Act of Parliament of the Parliament of England enacted during the reign of Elizabeth I. It provided that if any person was convicted of conspiring to seize or destroy any castle or fortification held or garrisoned by the Queen's forces, then they and any associates were to be judged felons and suffer the death penalty without benefit of clergy or sanctuary. If any person was to prevent the use of any royal castle or ordnance by the crown, destroy any of the Queen's ships, or prevent the use of a harbour within the realm, then they were to be considered guilty of high treason and sentenced accordingly. The Act remained in force until the death of Elizabeth in 1603, when it expired, and was formally repealed by the Statute Law Revision Act 1863.

See also
Treasons Act 1534
Treason Act 1551

References
Select statutes and other constitutional documents illustrative of the reigns of Elizabeth and James I, ed. by G. W. Prothero. Oxford University Press, 1913. Fourth edition.
Chronological table of the statutes; HMSO, London. 1993.

1572 in law
1572 in England
Acts of the Parliament of England (1485–1603)
Treason in England